Hew Raymond Griffiths (born 8 November 1962, UK) has been accused by the United States of being a ring leader of DrinkOrDie or DOD, an underground software infringement network, using the online identity of "Bandido". Griffiths was living in Berkeley Vale in the Central Coast Region of NSW, Australia before he was placed on remand at Silverwater Correctional Centre. After fighting extradition for almost 3 years, Griffiths was finally extradited from Australia to the United States and on 20 February 2007, he appeared before Magistrate Judge Barry R. Portez of the U.S. District Court in Alexandria, Virginia. On 20 April, it was announced by the U.S. Department of Justice that Griffiths had entered a plea of guilty.

His case is of interest in that he is an Australian resident who has been indicted by a court in Virginia, United States for copyright infringement and conspiracy to infringe copyright under the US Code. Hew Raymond Griffiths, born in the United Kingdom, had never at any point physically left Australia since arriving in his adopted country at an early age. This is an unusual situation as the US extradition has not targeted a fugitive or a dangerous person who financially profited from his activities. However, the Australian courts and executive government have agreed to treat Griffiths' activities as having taken place in a US jurisdiction. The case therefore highlights the serious consequences for Australian Internet users who are charged with distributing US copyright-protected material.

Griffiths' extradition was very controversial in Australia, where his actions were not criminal.  The matter of USA v Griffiths has been cited as an example of how bilateral arrangements can lead to undesirable effects such as a loss of sovereignty and what some have described as draconian outcomes.

On 22 June 2007 Hew Griffiths was sentenced to 51 months in prison for conspiracy to commit copyright infringement.  Taking into account the 3 years he spent in Australian and US prisons prior to sentencing, he served a further 15 months in the US.  Griffiths' sentence attracted significant attention in Australia, and some attention in the United States and other countries which have recently signed, or are currently negotiating, bilateral Free Trade Agreements with the USA.

Griffiths finally returned to Australia on 2 March 2008, after 5 weeks as an illegal alien in the US immigration detention system following his release from prison on 26 January 2008 (Australia Day).  A condition of his repatriation to Australia was that he never again re-enter the United States, a country he had never visited before being extradited to it.

See also
Copyright infringement
DrinkOrDie
Operation Buccaneer
Warez

References

Aussie software pirate extradited, Sydney Morning Herald, 7 May 2007
Software pirates not safe at home, The New Zealand Herald, 7 September 2004.
Accused web pirate back behind bars, Sydney Morning Herald, 8 July 2004.
The unsolicited views of Internet Users, broadbandreports.com blog, 17 July 2004.
Illegal Internet Network reproduced and distributed pirated software, films and music worth $50 million – US DOJ 12 March 2003. 
Robbery under arms: Copyright law and the Australia–US Free Trade Agreement by Matthew Rimmer, First Monday, March 2006.
How To Kill A Country: Australia's Devastating Trade Deal With the United States paper by Linda Weiss, Elizabeth Thurbon & John Mathews, Evatt Foundation, 2 April 2005.
Global Software Piracy costing $54 Billion in 2005 – Computing.co.uk 23 May 2006.
Australian Copyright Act 1968
Copyright Law of the United States of America contained in Title 17 of the US Code.
IP Chapter of AUSFTA 2004.
'Bandido' Software Pirate Arraigned In U.S. On 2 Charges, Information Week, 21 February 2007.
Another One Sacrificed in the Name of an Alliance, Opinion Article by Richard Ackland, Sydney Morning Herald, 16 February 2007.
BitTorrent issues weblog 21 April 2007.
IPKAT intellectual property law issues weblog 23 April 2007.
Australian alliance issues weblog 8 May 2007.
Extradited Software Piracy Ringleader Sentenced to 51 Months in Prison 22 June 2007
Discussion on Australian Larvatus Prodeo blog of extradition 18 February 2007

1962 births
Living people
Central Coast (New South Wales)
Warez
Prisoners and detainees of the United States federal government
Australian people imprisoned abroad
People extradited from Australia
People extradited to the United States